Joshua Brillante (born 25 March 1993) is an Australian professional footballer who plays as a defensive midfielder  for Australian A-league club Melbourne Victory. He was named captain of Melbourne Victory ahead of the 2021/22 season. Brillante holds dual citizenship due to his Italian heritage.

Club career

Gold Coast United
Brillante made his A-League debut for Gold Coast on 3 December in a 1–0 loss to the North Queensland Fury.

Newcastle Jets
On 12 May 2012 it was announced he had signed for A-League club the Newcastle Jets.

ACF Fiorentina
On 15 July 2014, it was announced that Brillante decided to join Italian Serie A club Fiorentina. He made his debut for La Viola against Roma in their 2014–15 Serie A opener at the Stadio Olimpico. He was subbed after 35 minutes.

Loan to Empoli
Joshua Brillante went on loan to Empoli whom are also in the Serie A during the January 2015 mid season transfer period.

Loan to Como
Initially starting the 2015–16 season on loan from Fiorentina to Empoli, Joshua Brillante signed a new loan deal on 28 August 2015 with Como of the Serie B for the remainder of the season.

Joshua Brillante made his debut for Como on 12 September 2015 away to Livorno.

Sydney FC
On 12 July 2016 Brillante returned to the A-League, joining Sydney FC on a three-year deal. He scored his first domestic league goal against the Brisbane Roar on 19 November that year. He scored his second goal of the season against Perth Glory in the semi final.

Melbourne City
At the end of his contract with Sydney FC, Brillante was in talks to extend, but in the end was signed by Melbourne City, reportedly on a multi-year season contract.

Xanthi
In September 2020, Brillante left Melbourne City to join Greek club Xanthi under the coaching of Tony Popovic.

Melbourne Victory 
In July 2021, Brillante returned to his home country to play for the Melbourne Victory also under coach Tony Popovic. He was named captain ahead of the 2021/22 season despite not having played a competitive game for the team.

International career
In May 2018 he was named in Australia’s preliminary 26 man squad for the 2018 World Cup in Russia.

Career statistics

Club

International

Honours

Club
Gold Coast United
National Youth League: 2009–10, 2010–11

Sydney FC
A-League Premiership: 2016–17, 2017–18
A-League Championship: 2016–17, 2018–19
FFA Cup: 2017

Melbourne Victory
FFA Cup: 2021

Individual
 FFA Male U20 Footballer of the Year: 2013
 PFA A-League Team of the Year: 2016–17, 2017–18, 2021–22

References

External links
 

1993 births
Living people
Australian soccer players
Australian expatriate soccer players
Serie A players
Serie B players
Gold Coast United FC players
Newcastle Jets FC players
ACF Fiorentina players
Empoli F.C. players
Como 1907 players
Sydney FC players
Melbourne City FC players
Xanthi F.C. players
Melbourne Victory FC players
Expatriate footballers in Italy
Australian people of Italian descent
Australia international soccer players
Association football midfielders
Association football fullbacks
Sportspeople from Bundaberg